Bareck Bendaha (born 30 December 1983) is a French-Algerian football player who is currently playing for R.E. Virton in the Belgian Second Division.

References

1983 births
Living people
Algerian footballers
French footballers
French sportspeople of Algerian descent
Expatriate footballers in Belgium
Algerian expatriates in Belgium
R.E. Virton players
USM Annaba players
OFC Charleville players
Association football midfielders
Association football forwards